Alfred John Wendt (1913–1996) was a  Fijian cricketer.

Wendt was born in Levuka, Lomaiviti Province. He made his first-class debut for Fiji in 1948 against Wellington during Fiji's 1947/48 tour of New Zealand, where he played one first-class match during the tour against Canterbury. In his two first-class matches for Fiji he scored 67 runs at a batting average of 16.75, with a high score of 41.

Wendt also represented Fiji in six non first-class matches for Fiji on their 1947/48 tour of New Zealand, with his final match for Fiji coming against Bay of Plenty.

External links
Alfred Wendt at Cricinfo
Alfred Wendt at CricketArchive

1913 births
1996 deaths
People from Levuka
Fijian cricketers
Fijian people of German descent